Kanha Khiangsiri (also spelled Khiengsiri; 26 February 1912 – 23 June 1999), née Chuen Watthanaphat, was a Thai novelist. Writing under the pen name K. Surangkhanang, her 45 novels include the highly popular Ban Sai Thong and the influential The Prostitute (Ying Khon Chua), which reflected issues in Thailand's developing modern society. She was named a National Artist in literature in 1986.

References

Kanha Khiangsiri
Kanha Khiangsiri
Kanha Khiangsiri
1912 births
1999 deaths